Beaconhills College is a co-educational, ecumenical, independent school providing education from early learning to prep to year 12. The college has 2 campuses: One located in Pakenham and one located in Berwick, Victoria, Australia, each campus with a co-located a Little Beacons Learning Centre.

Beaconhills was established in 1982 by the Anglican and Uniting Churches to serve the education needs of the Christian community in the greater Pakenham area. The college celebrated its 30th anniversary in 2012.

College history

Inception
The idea to establish a local, independent, Christian school was conceived by a group of parishioners at St. John's Anglican Church in Upper Beaconsfield in 1980. By March 1981 a steering committee had been established with John McConchie appointed as chairperson. The steering committee called a public meeting at the Pakenham Hall on 11 March 1981 where the proposal to establish an ecumenical, co-educational, low-fee secondary school was ratified in the presence of some 250 people.

In 1981, as the steering committee continued to hold public meetings seeking support for the new school, a  site on Toomuc Valley Road, Pakenham was purchased and portable classrooms obtained from St. Catherine's School in Toorak, and Frank Millett was appointed as founding principal. On 3 February 1982 Beaconhills Christian College opened with 34 students and five staff. A dedication service was held at St. James Church on 28 March 1982. Frank Millet led the college as principal until 1988, by which time the college community had grown to include 388 students and a teaching staff of 30. John McConchie, having led the steering committee, was chairperson of the board until 1986.

Sport 
Beaconhills is an associate member of the Association of Coeducational Schools (ACS).

Notable former students 
Tom Bugg - AFL Footballer
Matthew Buntine - AFL Footballer
Callum Porter - AFL Footballer
Pippa Black - Actress

See also
 List of schools in Victoria
 List of high schools in Victoria
 Victorian Certificate of Education

References

External links
 Beaconhills College website

Private secondary schools in Victoria (Australia)
Gippsland Independent Schools
Educational institutions established in 1982
Anglican schools in Victoria (Australia)
1982 establishments in Australia
Buildings and structures in the City of Casey
Buildings and structures in the Shire of Cardinia